In the 2008 Kremlin Cup - Men's Doubles, Marat Safin and Dmitry Tursunov were the defending champions. They were both present but did not compete together. Safin partnered with Teymuraz Gabashvili, but lost in the first round to Stephen Huss and Ross Hutchins. Tursunov partnered with Igor Kunitsyn, but they were forced to withdraw due to a shoulder injury for Tursunov before their quarterfinals match against Sergiy Stakhovsky and Potito Starace.

Stakhovsky and Starace won in the final 7–6(7–4), 2–6, [10–6], against Stephen Huss and Ross Hutchins.

Seeds

Draw

Draw

References

External links
 Draw

Kremlin Cup
Kremlin Cup